Sunnal is a village in Belgaum district of Karnataka, India. Sunnal is a small village near Ramdurg, which is five kilometers from Ramdurg on Belgavi road, this village is famous for Maruthi Temple which has idol of lord Hanuman from ancient times. It is believed by thousands of devotees that by praying to lord Hanuman at Sunnal will be blessed twice by the lord Hanuman as his idol is seeing the devotees by both the eyes i.e., idol of lord Hanuman is in front facing towards the devotees. The Lord Hanuman temple of this village is popularly known as "Sunnal Hanumappa". Also the stretch of forest along Sunnal and Halloli Villages is a place comprising Bears. These are popularly known as "Sunnal Karadi" or "Sunnal Kaddi" in Kannada.

References

Villages in Belagavi district